The Marquette Golden Eagles women's basketball team represents Marquette University in Milwaukee, Wisconsin, United States. The school's team currently competes in the Big East after moving from Conference USA following the 2004–05 season.  The Golden Eagles first competed in the North Star Conference from 1986–87 until it joined the Midwestern Collegiate Conference (now Horizon League) for the 1989–90 and 1990–91 seasons.  The Golden Eagles changed conferences again, joining the Great Midwest Conference, where it competed for four seasons until joining Conference USA beginning with the 1995–96 season.  The women’s basketball team began competing in 1975–1976 under coach Tat Shiely, earning a 12–4 record in its first year.

2018–19 roster

Yearly records

NCAA tournament results

References

External links